Go Soeda was the defending champion, but decided not to participate.

Brian Dabul won the title, defeating Facundo Argüello 6–1, 6–3 in the final.

Seeds

  Izak van der Merwe (first round)
  Rogério Dutra da Silva (semifinals)
  Carlos Salamanca (withdrew due to left shoulder injury)
  Brian Dabul (champion)
  Víctor Estrella (first round)
  Sebastián Decoud (first round)
  Fernando Romboli (first round)
  Facundo Argüello (final)

Draw

Finals

Top half

Bottom half

References
 Main Draw
 Qualifying Draw

Manta Open - Singles
Manta Open